The North American blizzard of 2005 was a three-day storm that affected large areas of the northern United States, dropping more than 3 feet (0.9 m) of snow in parts of southeastern Massachusetts, as well as much of the Boston metropolitan area.  While this was by far the hardest hit region, it was also a significant snowstorm for the Philadelphia and New York City areas, which both suffered occasional blizzard conditions and  snow accumulations. 

The storm began dropping snow on the upper Midwest on Thursday, January 20, 2005. It slowly moved eastward affecting the Great Lakes region and the Mid-Atlantic states on Friday and Saturday, January 21 and January 22, 2005. On Saturday evening the storm entered the Southern New England area. The strength of the storm, coupled with the extreme Arctic temperatures, created a light, fluffy snow which increased the snowfall totals.

The storm shut down Logan International Airport in Boston, Massachusetts and T. F. Green Airport in Rhode Island, while also impairing travel throughout much of Massachusetts due to the high amount of snow covering the roads.  Practically all schools in the Metrowest and South East regions of Massachusetts were closed for at least two days.  Cape Cod Community College, as well as all public schools on Cape Cod, Martha's Vineyard and Nantucket were closed for up to a week.

After traveling across the Atlantic Ocean, the storm system hit parts of Great Britain and Ireland and the Scandinavian peninsula, causing even more widespread blackouts and a small number of deaths in the region.

In New York City, 3 Firefighter Down Calls (5-5-5-5) we're transmitted during this Blizzad. First in the Mount Hope section of the Bronx. Box 2997 at 226 East 178 Street was tramsitted at 0759. Despite the conditions Engine 42 and Ladder 27 arrived 4 minutes later. At 0823 Division 7 made the call, "Transmit a second alarm. We have a MAYDAY from several fire fighters." Lieutenant Curtis Meyran was the first LODD of this Blizzard, FF John Bellow died a short time later. Next from Battalion 44 at a First Alarm in Brooklyn at 577 Jerome Avenue in the East New York section, "Transmit a second alarm! We have a Mayday!". Fire Fighter Richard Sclafani, somehow, became separated from the rest of the company. He was found minutes later on the cellar stairs in respiratory arrest. He was brought to the local trauma center but it was too late. The LODD's we're 1129, 1130 and 1131 respectively.

Conditions
Conditions throughout much of eastern Massachusetts were near-whiteout and, in some cases, were whiteout.  State Police in both Dartmouth and Middleborough suggested that residents travel as little as possible.  Major highways, such as Route 24, Route 6 and Route 140, could not be properly cleared because of the heavy snowfall and high winds.  Secondary highways, such as Route 79 were nearly impassable in some areas.

Many Boston-area newscasters credit the New England Patriots football game on January 23 for keeping most travellers indoors, avoiding the pile-ups and endless lines of stuck cars that were the hallmark of the Blizzard of 1978.  The fact that the storm fell on a weekend when many people did not have to go to work or school also helped to this effect.

Aftermath
With much of the snow cleared from the roads by the evening of January 24, snowpiles on street corners were in excess of ten feet high in some locations.  Roads were severely narrowed in most congested areas, due to parked cars that were not towed and instead simply plowed in.  Most schools in eastern Massachusetts and Rhode Island remained closed for an extended period of time to allow for clean-up of the road debris.

Storm totals
Location - storm total - time/date - comments -
snowfall measurement

Connecticut

Litchfield County
Litchfield- 12.2

Hartford County
East Granby 14.3 inches (36.3 cm)
Burlington  13.3 inches (33.7 cm)
Southington 12.8 inches (32.5 cm),  8:54 p.m. January 24 General public
Windsor Locks 12.5 inches (31.8 cm),  1:08 p.m. January 23 airport ang (bdl)
South Windsor 11.5 inches (29.2 cm),  1:14 p.m. January 23
Windsor 11.0 inches (27.9 cm),  8:20 p.m. January 23
Unionville 8.8 inches (22.4 cm),  1:30 p.m. January 23

Tolland County
Stafford Springs 16.0 inches (40.6 cm),  2:23 p.m. January 23
Hebron 12.0 inches (30.5 cm),  1:20 p.m. January 23
Andover 7.0 inches (17.8 cm),  3:09 p.m. January 23
Storrs 7.0 inches (17.8 cm),  1:23 p.m. January 23

Windham County
North Grosvenordale 14.0 inches (35.6 cm),  2:18 p.m. January 23
Plainfield 9.5 inches (24.1 cm),  1:22 p.m. January 23
Ashford 9.0 inches (22.9 cm),  1:16 p.m. January 23
Eastford 8.0 inches (20.3 cm),  1:21 p.m. January 23

Massachusetts

Barnstable County
Mashpee 30.5 inches (77.5 cm), 5:23 p.m. January 23
Sagamore Beach 30.0 inches (76.2 cm),  9:44 p.m. January 23
Yarmouth Port 29.0 inches (73.7 cm),  2:40 p.m. January 23
Brewster 28.5 inches (72.4 cm),  8:20 p.m. January 23
Harwich Port 28.0 inches (71.1 cm),  10:49 p.m. January 23 general public
Sandwich 27.5 inches (69.9 cm),  3:15 p.m. January 23 NWS employee
North Eastham 26.5 inches (67.3 cm),  5:28 p.m. January 23

Bristol County
New Bedford 26.0 inches (66 cm),  5 Ft (1.5 m) Drifts
Taunton 26.0 inches (66 cm),  3:31 p.m. January 23, 5 Ft (1.5 m) Drifts
Fairhaven 25.5 inches (64.8 cm),  8:47 p.m. January 23
Rehoboth 25.0 inches (63.5 cm),  2:47 p.m. January 23
Easton 23.0 inches (58.4 cm),  1:07 p.m. January 23 W.E. 1.71 
Acushnet 21.5 inches (54.6 cm),  3:04 p.m. January 23
Somerset 20.0 inches (50.8 cm),  3:03 p.m. January 23
Taunton 18.0 inches (45.7 cm),  7:00 p.m. January 23 NWS Office kbox
Seekonk 15.0 inches (38.1 cm),  4:30 p.m. January 23, 5 Ft (1.5 m) drifts

Dukes County
Edgartown 24.0 inches (61.0 cm),  2:40 p.m. January 23

Essex County
Salem 38.0 inches (96.5 cm),  2:56 p.m. January 23 Em
North Beverly 32.0 inches (81.3 cm),  8:25 p.m. January 23
Peabody 30.0 inches (76.2 cm),  1:55 p.m. January 23
Saugus 30.0 inches (76.2 cm),  2:34 p.m. January 23
Topsfield 30.0 inches (76.2 cm),  5:52 p.m. January 23
West Peabody 30.0 inches (76.2 cm),  3:53 p.m. January 23
Marblehead Neck 29.0 inches (73.7 cm),  2:34 p.m. January 23
Methuen 27.0 inches (68.6 cm),  2:04 p.m. January 23
Salem 27.0 inches (68.6 cm),  10:40 p.m. January 23 Salem state
Haverhill 26.5 inches (67.3 cm),  9:59 p.m. January 23, 7 Ft (2.1 m) drifts
Manchester 26.5 inches (67.3 cm),  3:09 p.m. January 23
Beverly 26.0 inches (66 cm),  8:02 p.m. January 23 CO-Op observer
Ipswich 26.0 inches (66 cm),  3:10 p.m. January 23
Marblehead 26.0 inches (66 cm),  9:41 p.m. January 23
Lynn 24.0 inches  (61 cm),  2:50 p.m. January 23
Rowley 24.0 inches (61 cm),  2:56 p.m. January 23
Swampscott 24.0 inches (61 cm),  3:53 p.m. January 23
Lawrence 23.0 inches (58.4 cm),  1:30 p.m. January 23
North Andover 26.0 inches (66.0 cm),  1:00 p.m. January 23, 6 Ft (1.8 m) drifts

Franklin County
Ashfield 15.5 inches (39.4 cm),  3:38 p.m. January 23

Hampden County
Chicopee 14.0 inches (35.6 cm),  11:56 p.m. January 23
Granville 12.0 inches (30.5 cm),  2:15 p.m. January 23
Wilbraham 11.0 inches (27.9 cm),  2:07 p.m. January 23
Southwick 10.0 inches (25.4 cm),  2:23 p.m. January 23, 0.84 inches (2.13 cm),  we

Hampshire County
Southampton 12.5 inches (31.8 cm),  2:06 p.m. January 23
Northampton 12.0 inches (30.5 cm),  2:32 p.m. January 23
South Hadley 11.0 inches (27.9 cm),  2:31 p.m. January 23
Amherst 10.0 inches (25.4 cm),  2:06 p.m. January 23
Belchertown 8.5 inches (21.6 cm),  2:05 p.m. January 23

Middlesex County
Melrose 36.0 inches (91.4 cm),  1:16 p.m. January 23
Cambridge 30.0 inches (76.2 cm),  2:58 p.m. January 23
Wakefield 28.0 inches (71.1 cm),  4:00 p.m. January 23
Billerica 27.5 inches (69.9 cm),  9:17 p.m. January 23
South Chelmsford 27.0 inches (68.6 cm),  1:14 p.m. January 23
Everett 26.5 inches (67.3 cm),  3:00 p.m. January 23
Belmont 26.0 inches (66 cm),  9:18 p.m. January 23
North Billerica 25.0 inches (63.5 cm),  1:00 p.m. January 23
Malden 28.5 inches (71.6 cm), 2:30 p.m. January 23
Wilmington 27.0 inches (68.6 cm),  1:37 p.m. January 23
Woburn 24.0 inches (61 cm),  10:40 p.m. January 23
Wayland 22.0 inches (55.9 cm),  3:40 p.m. January 23
Westford 22.0 inches (55.9 cm),  5:26 p.m. January 23
Lexington 21.0 inches (53.3 cm),  2:49 p.m. January 23
Stoneham 21.0 inches (53.3 cm),  1:23 p.m. January 23
Ayer 20.3 inches (51.6 cm),  3:30 p.m. January 23
Littleton 19.0 inches (48.3 cm),  2:41 p.m. January 23
Chelmsford 18.5 inches (47 cm),  2:19 p.m. January 23
Dracut 18.2 inches (46.2 cm),  2:20 p.m. January 23
Pepperell 18.0 inches (45.7 cm),  2:49 p.m. January 23
Townsend 18.0 inches (45.7 cm),  4:02 p.m. January 23
Shirley 14.0 inches (35.6 cm),  1:05 p.m. January 23
Hudson 13.5 inches (34.3 cm),  3:00 p.m. January 23

Nantucket County
Nantucket 24.0 inches (61 cm),  4:00 p.m. January 23

Norfolk County
Weymouth 28.5 inches (72.4 cm),  2:44 p.m. January 23
Braintree 28.3 inches (71.9 cm),  4:42 p.m. January 23
North Attleboro 28.1 inches (71.9 cm),  7:37 p.m. January 23
Milton 27.0 inches (68.6 cm),  4:00 p.m. January 23
South Weymouth 27.0 inches (68.6 cm),  9:18 p.m. January 23
Sharon 26.0 inches (66 cm),  4:30 p.m. January 23
Foxboro 25.1 inches (63.8 cm),  5:11 p.m. January 23
Millis 25.0 inches (63.5 cm),  4:00 p.m. January 23
Needham 25.0 inches (63.5 cm),  9:21 p.m. January 23
Randolph 25.0 inches (63.5 cm),  8:19 p.m. January 23
Franklin 23.0 inches (58.4 cm),  3:09 p.m. January 23
Canton 22.0 inches (55.9 cm),  2:59 p.m. January 23
Dedham 22.0 inches (55.9 cm),  4:00 p.m. January 23
Walpole 20.5 inches (52.1 cm),  2:40 p.m. January 23
Plainville 20.0 inches (50.8 cm),  2:48 p.m. January 23
Wellesley 17.2 inches (43.7 cm),  2:39 p.m. January 23

Plymouth County
Plymouth 36.0 inches (91.4 cm),  7:02 p.m. January 23
Plympton 35.0 inches (88.9 cm),  10:41 p.m. January 23 general public
Lakeville 30.0 inches (76.2 cm),  1:17 p.m. January 23
Manomet 28.0 inches (71.1 cm),  10:40 p.m. January 23
Rockland 27.0 inches (68.6 cm),  8:03 p.m. January 23
Wareham 26.0 inches (66 cm),  3:09 p.m. January 23
Marshfield 25.0 inches (63.5 cm),  2:30 p.m. January 23
Hanson 24.2 inches (61.5 cm),  3:11 p.m. January 23
Kingston 24.0 inches (61 cm),  9:41 p.m. January 23
West Duxbury 24.0 inches (61 cm),  2:43 p.m. January 23
Whitman 23.0 inches (58.4 cm),  3:02 p.m. January 23
Scituate 21.5 inches (54.6 cm),  4:01 p.m. January 23
Brockton 21.2 inches (53.8 cm),  5:20 p.m. January 23
Marion 21.0 inches (53.3 cm),  8:35 p.m. January 23
Hingham 20.5 inches (52.1 cm),  5:07 p.m. January 23

Suffolk County
Winthrop 28.6 inches (72.6 cm),  4:00 p.m. January 23
Winthrop Square 27.0 inches (68.6 cm),  10:00 p.m. January 23
Boston Common 26.0 inches (66 cm),  1:16 p.m. January 23 NWS employee
Roslindale 25.5 inches (64.8 cm),  3:05 p.m. January 23
East Boston 22.5 inches (57.2 cm),  7:00 p.m. January 23 Logan kbos

Worcester County
Northborough 26.0 inches (66 cm),  3:19 p.m. January 23
Uxbridge 26.0 inches (66 cm),  1:29 p.m. January 23
Shrewsbury 23.0 inches (58.4 cm),  3:25 p.m. January 23
Webster 23.0 inches (58.4 cm),  2:02 p.m. January 23
Gardner 22.0 inches (55.9 cm),  2:50 p.m. January 23
Southborough 22.0 inches (55.9 cm),  3:11 p.m. January 23
North Grafton 21.0 inches (53.3 cm),  1:04 p.m. January 23 ret NWS orh oic
Fitchburg 20.7 inches (52.6 cm),  2:10 p.m. January 23
Holden 19.0 inches (48.3 cm),  2:04 p.m. January 23
Lunenburg 18.5 inches (47 cm),  2:02 p.m. January 23
Boylston 18.1 inches (46 cm),  3:04 p.m. January 23
Old Sturbridge 18.0 inches (45.7 cm),  2:03 p.m. January 23
Leicester 17.0 inches (43.2 cm),  1:33 p.m. January 23, 3-4 Ft (0.9 m-1.2 m) drifts
Spencer 18.0 inches (45.7 cm), 2:05 p.m. January 23
Oxford 15.0 inches (38.1 cm),  2:07 p.m. January 23
West Brookfield 15.0 inches (38.1 cm),  2:30 p.m. January 23
Ashburnham 14.0 inches (35.6 cm),  9:17 p.m. January 23
West Warren 12.5 inches (31.8 cm),  3:14 p.m. January 23
Athol 12.0 inches (30.5 cm),  2:33 p.m. January 23

New Hampshire

Cheshire County
Dublin 18.5 inches (47 cm),  1:21 p.m. January 23
Alstead 12.5 inches (31.8 cm),  1:03 p.m. January 23 v

Hillsborough County
Hollis 19.0 inches (48.3 cm),  3:45 p.m. January 23
Nashua 18.5 inches (47 cm),  4:00 p.m. January 23
New Ipswich 17.5 inches (44.5 cm),  1:35 p.m. January 23
Greenville 16.5 inches (41.9 cm),  2:20 p.m. January 23
Hudson 15.6 inches (39.6 cm),  1:36 p.m. January 23
South Weare 12.5 inches (31.8 cm),  4:29 p.m. January 23

Rockingham County
Atkinson 26.8 inches (68.07 cm) 7:00 a.m. January 23
Plaistow 24.0 inches (60.1 cm)  12:35 p.m. January 23

New York

Ulster County
Kingston

Rhode Island

Bristol County
Bristol 21.0 inches (53.3 cm),  5:02 p.m. January 23

Kent County
West Warwick 24.5 inches (62.2 cm),  2:51 p.m. January 23
Warwick 23.4 inches (59.4 cm),  1:02 p.m. January 23 TF Green (Pvd)
Warwick 20.9 inches (53.1 cm),  3:16 p.m. January 23
Coventry 17.5 inches (44.5 cm),  4:40 p.m. January 23

Providence County
North Cumberland 27.0 inches (50.8 cm),  7:45 p.m. January 23
Johnston Memorial 22.5 inches (57.2 cm),  4:03 p.m. January 23 NWS employee
Greenville 21.5 inches (54.6 cm),  1:13 p.m. January 23
Cranston 21.0 inches (53.3 cm),  2:53 p.m. January 23
Rumford 19.0 inches (48.3 cm),  10:46 p.m. January 23
Woonsocket Reservoir 18.9 inches (48 cm),  1:55 p.m. January 23, 1.36 inches (3.45 cm),  we
Pawtucket 16.0 inches (40.6 cm),  2:10 p.m. January 23

Washington County
Hopkinton 21.0 inches (53.3 cm),  2:36 p.m. January 23
Westerly 20.0 inches (50.8 cm),  5:35 p.m. January 23, 5 Ft (1.5 m) Drifts
North Kingstown 17.0 inches (43.2 cm),  1:02 p.m. January 23

Pennsylvania

Berks County
Morgantown

Bucks County
Yardley 
Langhorne 
Perkasie

Carbon County
Albrightsville 
Lehighton

Chester County
Phoenixville 
Honey Brook

Delaware County
Radnor 
Boothwyn

Lehigh County
Lehigh Valley International Airport 
Germansville

Monroe County
Saylorsburg 
Pocono Summit

Montgomery County
Conshohocken 
Green Lane 
Palm

Northampton County
Forks Township 
Easton

Philadelphia
Northeast Philadelphia 
Philadelphia International Airport

See also
List of Regional Snowfall Index Category 4 winter storms

External links
Photos from the blizzard of 2005 from Saugus

2005 meteorology
2005 natural disasters in the United States
Blizzards in the United States
Nor'easters
January 2005 events in North America